The 2010–11 Sydney Blue Sox season was the team's first season. The Blue Sox competed in the Australian Baseball League (ABL) against five other teams, playing its home games at Blacktown International Sportspark Sydney.

Regular season

Standings

Record vs opponents

Game log 

|-bgcolor=#bbffbb
| 1
| 6 November
| 
| 1-0
| W. Lundgren
| J. Heo
| D. Koo
| 1-0
| 
|-bgcolor=#bbffbb
| 2
| 12 November
| 
| 4-2
| C. Oxspring
| J. Heo
| D. Koo
| 2-0
| 
|-bgcolor=#bbffbb
| 3
| 13 November
| 
| 13-3
| W. Lundgren
| P. Brassington
| -
| 3-0
| 
|-bgcolor=#bbffbb
| 4
| 14 November
| 
| 7-5
| A. Sookee
| T. Atherton
| D. Koo
| 4-0
| 
|-bgcolor=#ffbbbb
| 5
| 18 November
| @ 
| 5-9
| J. Albury
| W. Lundgren
| -
| 4-1
| 
|-bgcolor=#ffbbbb
| 6
| 19 November
| @  (DH 1)
| 3-4
| C. Mowday
| D. Koo
| -
| 4-2
| 
|-bgcolor=#bbffbb
| 7
| 19 November
| @  (DH 2)
| 4-0
| C. Oxspring
| R. Searle
| -
| 5-2
| 
|-bgcolor=#bbffbb
| 8
| 21 November
| @ 
| 2-0
| C. Anderson
| J. Erasmus
| D. Koo
| 6-2
| 
|-bgcolor=#ffbbbb
| 9
| 26 November
| 
| 1-6
| J. Albury
| W. Lundgren
| -
| 6-3
| 
|-bgcolor=#bbffbb
| 10
| 27 November
|  (DH 1)
| 3-1
| D. Welch
| R. Searle
| D. Koo
| 7-3
|  
|-bgcolor=#ffbbbb
| 11
| 27 November
|  (DH 2)
| 3-12
| C. Mowday
| M. Williams
| -
| 7-4
|  
|-bgcolor=#bbffbb
| 12
| 28 November
| 
| 1-0
| V. Harris
| J. Erasmus
| -
| 8-4
| 
|-

|-bgcolor=#bbffbb
| 13
| 3 December
| 
| 3-1
| C. Oxspring
| A. Blackley
| D. Koo
| 9-4
| 
|-bgcolor=#bbbbbb
| 14
| 4 December
|  (DH 1)
| PPD - RAIN
| -
| -
| -
| -
| 
|-bgcolor=#bbbbbb
| 15
| 4 December
|  (DH 2)
| PPD - RAIN
| -
| -
| -
| -
| 
|-bgcolor=#bbffbb
| 16
| 5 December
|  (DH 1)
| 2-1
| W. Lundgren
| J. Ono
| D. Koo
| 10-4
| 
|-bgcolor=#bbbbff
| 17
| 5 December
|  (DH 2)
| 1-1
| -
| -
| -
| 10-4
| 
|-bgcolor=#ffbbbb
| 18
| 10 December
| @ 
| 4-6
| A. Bright
| M. Rae
| -
| 10-5
| 
|-bgcolor=#ffbbbb
| 19
| 11 December
| @  (DH 1)
| 6-7
| M. Hoshino
| T. Van Steensel
| -
| 10-6
| 
|-bgcolor=#bbffbb
| 20
| 11 December
| @  (DH 2)
| 4-1
| D. Welch
| T. Blackley
| D. Koo
| 11-6
| 
|-bgcolor=#ffbbbb
| 21
| 12 December
| @  (DH 1)
| 5-12
| M. Blackmore
| C. Anderson
| -
| 11-7
| 
|-bgcolor=#ffbbbb
| 22
| 12 December
| @  (DH 2)
| 3-18
| J. Ono
| V. Harris
| -
| 11-8
| 
|-bgcolor=#ffbbbb
| 23
| 16 December
| @ 
| 3-4
| D. Ruzic
| V. Harris
| -
| 11-9
|  
|-bgcolor=#bbffbb
| 24
| 17 December
| @ 
| 5-0
| D. Welch
| P. Mildren
| 
| 12-9
| 
|-bgcolor=#ffbbbb
| 25
| 18 December
| @ 
| 3-7
| B. Maurer
| W. Lundgren
| -
| 12-10
| 
|-bgcolor=#bbffbb
| 26
| 19 December
| @ 
| 4-0
| C. Anderson
| D. Ruzic
| -
| 13-10
| 
|-bgcolor=#bbffbb
| 27
| 30 December
| @ 
| 8-1
| C. Oxspring
| L. Hendriks
| -
| 14-10
| 
|-bgcolor=#bbffbb
| 28
| 31 December
| @ 
| 5-1
| D. Welch
| D. Schmidt
| D. Koo
| 15-10
| 
|-

|-bgcolor=#bbffbb
| 29
| 1 January
| @ 
| 3-2
| D. Koo
| M. Zachary
| -
| 16-10
| 
|-bgcolor=#bbffbb
| 30
| 2 January
| @ 
| 10-3
| C. Anderson
| W. Saupold
| -
| 17-10
| 
|-bgcolor=#ffbbbb
| 31
| 6 January
| 
| 1-3
| T. Caughey
| C. Oxspring
| B. Wise
| 17-11
| 
|-bgcolor=#ffbbbb
| 32
| 7 January
| 
| 7-11
| D. Schmidt
| M. Williams
| -
| 17-12
| 
|-bgcolor=#ffbbbb
| 33
| 8 January
| 
| 3-4
| C. McCurry
| W. Lundgren
| B. Wise
| 17-13
|  
|-bgcolor=#ffbbbb
| 34
| 9 January
| 
| 1-4
| M. Zachary
| C. Anderson
| -
| 17-14
| 
|-bgcolor=#bbffbb
| 35
| 12 January
| 
| 5-4
| R. Thompson
| T. Becker
| -
| 18-14
| 
|-bgcolor=#bbffbb
| 36
| 13 January
| 
| 4-3
| D. Welch
| P. Mildren
| -
| 19-14
| 
|-bgcolor=#bbffbb
| 37
| 14 January
| 
| 6-5
| J. Sullivan
| D. Fidge
| -
| 20-14
| 
|-bgcolor=#bbffbb
| 38
| 15 January
| 
| 6-2
| W. Lundgren
| D. Ruzic
| -
| 21-14
| 
|-bgcolor=#ffbbbb
| 39
| 20 January
| @ 
| 1-5
| J. Lee
| C. Oxspring
| T. Atherton
| 21-15
| 
|-bgcolor=#bbffbb
| 40
| 21 January
| @ 
| 10-3
| T. Grattan
| H. Beard
| D. Koo
| 22-15
| 
|-bgcolor=#bbffbb
| 41
| 22 January
| @  (DH 1)
| 5-4
| D. Koo
| T. Atherton
| -
| 23-15
| 
|-bgcolor=#bbffbb
| 42
| 22 January
| @  (DH 2)
| 4-2
| V. Harris
| J. Lee
| D. Koo
| 24-15
| 
|-

Postseason 

|-bgcolor=#ffbbbb 
| 1
| 27 January
| 
| 2-4
| B. Grice
| C. Oxspring
| B. Wise
| 0-1
| 
|-bgcolor=#ffbbbb 
| 2
| 28 January
| @ 
| 2-9
| T. Caughey
| W. Lundgren
| -
| 0-2
|  
|-

|-bgcolor=#bbffbb
| 1
| 4 February
| 
| 8-0
| D. Welch
| M. Brackman
| -
| 1-0
| 
|-bgcolor=#ffbbbb 
| 2
| 5 February
| @ 
| 0-4
| B. Maurer
| W. Lundgren
| -
| 1-1
| 
|-bgcolor=#ffbbbb 
| 3
| 6 February
| 
| 4-7
| M. Brackman
| D. Koo
| -
| 1-2
| 
|-

Roster

References 

Sydney Blue Sox
Sydney Blue Sox